Edwin Kiptoo (born 14 August 1993) is a Kenyan long-distance runner competing in marathon and half marathon events. In 2016, he won the Beirut Marathon with a time of 2:13:19.

He also won several half marathon events: the Great Eastern Run and Cardiff Half Marathon in 2011, the Bath Half Marathon in 2012, the Zwolle Half Marathon in 2013 and the Egmond Half Marathon in 2018.

In 2015 and 2016 he won the Dam tot Damloop, a 10-mile race held in the Netherlands. In 2016 he also finished in 3rd place in the Brighton Marathon.

In 2019, he finished in 2nd place in the Zevenheuvelenloop, a 15 kilometres event held in the Netherlands.

In 2022, he finished first place in the annual Mexico City Marathon held on the streets on the streets of Mexico City.

References

External links 

 

Living people
1993 births
Place of birth missing (living people)
Kenyan male marathon runners
Kenyan male long-distance runners